Hyalinobatrachium cappellei is a species of frog in the family Centrolenidae. It is found in the Guianas (Venezuela, Guyana, French Guiana, Suriname) and in parts of the Amazon Basin in Brazil. It was until recently (2011) considered to be a synonym of Hyalinobatrachium fleischmanni.

Hyalinobatrachium cappellei are known for prolonged breeding and parental expression. Usually, the fitness and survival of offspring benefit at a loss to the parent. However, for this species, the males likelihood of mating increases with the number of clutches they attend    (Vargas-Salinas, 2014).  

A close species is called Hyalinobatrachium fleischmanni.

References

  

cappellei
Amphibians of Brazil
Amphibians of French Guiana
Amphibians of Guyana
Amphibians of Suriname
Amphibians of Venezuela
Amphibians described in 1904
Taxa named by Theodorus Willem van Lidth de Jeude